Blair Tindall (born February 2, 1960) is an American oboist, performer, producer, speaker, and journalist.

Early life and education
Tindall was born in Chapel Hill, North Carolina, to historian George Brown Tindall and Blossom Tindall. She started playing the piano at an early age and switched to oboe when joining the junior high school band; because of her surname's place in alphabetical order, she was the last person able to choose an instrument, and the only one available was the oboe. She attended high school at the North Carolina School of the Arts, received bachelor's and master's degrees from the Manhattan School of Music, and a masters in communication from Stanford University, which she attended on a full tuition fellowship. She also attended Columbia University.

Career
Tindall spent 23 years as a professional musician in New York City, playing with such groups as the New York Philharmonic, Orpheus Chamber Orchestra, and the Orchestra of St. Luke's, presenting a critically acclaimed solo debut at Carnegie Recital Hall, and earning a jazz Grammy nomination. She has also performed on many film soundtracks, including those of the movies Malcolm X, for which she was lauded in CD Review Magazine, Crooklyn, and Twilight. She has also performed with Rolling Stones drummer Charlie Watts at the Blue Note Jazz Club.

Tindall taught journalism at Stanford and music at the University of California, Berkeley and Mills College. She has also received residencies at the MacDowell Colony, Kimmel Harding Nelson Center for the Arts, and the Ucross Foundation.

While studying at Stanford, Tindall supported herself by performing with the San Francisco Symphony and as a soloist with the San Francisco Contemporary Music Players. During this time, she was also a staff business reporter at the Examiner (Hearst) and critic-at-large for the Contra Costa Times in Walnut Creek. She went on to write for The New York Times, Agence France-Presse, the Los Angeles Times, Sierra, The Sydney Morning Herald, and the International Herald Tribune.

In 2005, she published Mozart in the Jungle: Sex, Drugs, and Classical Music (Atlantic Monthly Press), a memoir of her experiences in the classical music world, which National Public Radio named one of the top five arts stories of the year. Her book was also lauded by musicologist Richard Taruskin in The New Republic as "the smartest take on [the classical music] situation". In 2014, the book was  adapted for an Amazon Studios web video series of the same name. The pilot was written by Roman Coppola, Jason Schwartzman, and Alex Timbers, and directed by Paul Weitz. The series stars Lola Kirke, Malcolm McDowell, Saffron Burrows, Bernadette Peters, and Gael García Bernal.

Personal life
Tindall married science educator Bill Nye on February 3, 2006. The ceremony was performed by Rick Warren at The Entertainment Gathering at the Skirball Cultural Center in Los Angeles. Yo-Yo Ma provided the music. Seven weeks later, the State of California declared the marriage invalid, for reasons that neither Tindall nor Nye have ever revealed. At that point Nye left the relationship, and had the marriage annulled. In 2007, Tindall broke into Nye's house and stole several items including his laptop, which she used to send defamatory emails impersonating him, and damaged his garden with herbicide. In response, Nye obtained a restraining order against her. Tindall acknowledged killing his plants but denied being a threat to him. After violating the order in 2009, Tindall was ordered to pay $57,000 of Nye's legal expenses.

In 2012, Nye sued Tindall for unpaid attorney's fees after she failed to repay the $57,000.

References

External links
 Blair Tindall official website

1960 births
American classical oboists
American women journalists
American memoirists
American music journalists
Columbia University alumni
Journalists from New York City
Living people
Manhattan School of Music alumni
Mills College faculty
People from Chapel Hill, North Carolina
Stanford University alumni
Stanford University faculty
University of North Carolina School of the Arts alumni
University of California, Berkeley faculty
American women memoirists
Women writers about music
American women academics
21st-century American women